Biagicola is a monotypic moth genus of the family Erebidae. Its only species, Biagicola signipennis, is found in New Guinea. Both the genus and the species were first described by Strand in 1914.

References

Calpinae
Monotypic moth genera